Katrín Tanja Davíðsdóttir (born 10 May 1993) is an Icelandic CrossFit athlete known for her eight appearances at the CrossFit Games. She is the women's champion of the 2015 and 2016 CrossFit Games.  Katrín is the second woman to repeat as champion, following in the footsteps of her countrywoman, 2011 and 2012 CrossFit Games champion Anníe Þórisdóttir.

CrossFit Games career
Katrín's only event win at the 2015 Games came in the final event, Pedal to the Metal 2, but that was enough to move her ahead of countrywoman Ragnheiður Sara Sigmundsdóttir, who had been in first place going into the last two events.

Katrín missed qualification in 2014 due to a relatively poor performance at the Europe Regional on Event 5, a combination of legless rope climbs and sprints. Katrín finished in the top 10 on every 2014 Regional Event except this one, in which she dropped to 24th. In the end, 9 points separated Katrín from the final 2014 Games qualifier out of the Europe Regional, third-ranked Norwegian athlete Kristin Holte.

Katrín has said that missing qualification in 2014 was the "differentiator" that helped her come back to the Games and win in 2015.

CrossFit Games results

Training background
Katrín started doing CrossFit in September 2011 at the age of 18. She had 10 years of training as a gymnast as well as 1 year of competition experience in track and field (athletics).  

Katrín currently trains at Reebok CrossFit Reykjavik under coach Jami Tikkanen. From 2016 to 2021, she trained under coach Ben Bergeron at CrossFit New England in the United States of America. Prior to this, she trained at Reebok CrossFit Reykjavik, in Reykjavik, Iceland, and CrossFit Stodin.

Television appearance 
Katrín appeared on the 30th season premiere of The Amazing Race, where she asked teams to identify two national tonics: Brennivín and Þorskalýsi.

Personal life
Katrín's grandfather is Helgi Ágústsson, the former ambassador of Iceland to the United States. Since 2021, she is in a relationship with Canadian former professional ice hockey player, Brooks Laich.

References

CrossFit athletes
1993 births
Living people
Katrin Davidsdottir
Icelandic expatriates in the United States
Sportspeople from Reykjavík